Highway 2 (Kvish 2) is an Israeli highway located on the coastal plain of the Mediterranean Sea. It begins as a major arterial road within Tel Aviv, becoming a freeway as it exits the city northward continuing to Haifa. North of Tel Aviv, the highway is also called The Coastal Highway (Kvish HaHof).

Highway 2 is one of the busiest highways in the country, and drivers experience frequent traffic congestion between Hadera and Tel Aviv during rush hours. The northern sections are also congested at times, especially during weekends and holidays, when many Israelis travel north for vacation.

History
The first section of the highway between Tel Aviv and Netanya was built in the early 1950s as a two lane road with at-grade intersections. The next section was built later that decade, extending the highway north to Olga Junction in Hadera. This section was also built as a two lane road. In 1965 the highway was widened to four lanes between Tel Aviv and Hadera, however grade separations were not built at this point.

The last section of the highway, between Olga Junction and Haifa, opened in 1969. When this section opened it was the first freeway in Israel. Deteriorating road conditions caused by years of neglect led to this section being downgraded from its original freeway status. Road signs on this section are still blue (as opposed to green on regular highways), however there are a few signs indicating an entrance or exit from a freeway and the maximum speed limit is 90–110 km/h, which makes it an Israeli freeway.

The junctions on the older sections of the highway were gradually grade separated: Netanya Interchange was built in 1974, Poleg Interchange in 1975, Havazelet Interchange in 1989, Yanai Interchange in 1990, Olga Interchange in 1993, Hof HaSharon Interchange in 1994 and Rabin Interchange and HaSira Interchange in 1995. Today the highway is grade separated along its entire route between the Haifa South and West Glilot interchanges.

The Tel Aviv–Netanya section was widened to six lanes in the 1990s.

The West Glilot Interchange opened on February 28, 2007, providing a direct connection to eastbound Highway 5 and the Ayalon Highway.

Coastal roadway corridor 
The Carmel Tunnels form a northern extension of Highway 2, which connects directly to Highway 22 in the Krayot area north of Haifa. This northern extension along with the Ayalon Highway and parts of Highway 4 make up a series of controlled-access highways that together form an inter-city highway corridor stretching along most of Israel's Mediterranean coast, from Acre (Akko) in the north to Ashdod in the south. In the future a parallel, but more inland controlled-access corridor will also be provided by Highway 6 when it is fully built.

Plans
There are plans to continue the six lane section north to the Zikhron Ya'akov Interchange. These plans also include upgrading the remaining section between Zikhron Ya'akov and Haifa back to freeway standards. As part of this effort, works to rebuild and widen the section between Havatzelet HaSharon and the Olga interchange are expected to commence in 2020 at a cost of NIS1.2 billion (equivalent to US$330 million in 2018 dollars).

Interchanges

References

External links
Video journey of the entire highway – The freeway section begins at the Glilot Interchange around 18m30s into the video. The Yarkon River bridge can be seen at 13m20s. The section between the Yarkon River bridge and the Glilot Interchange served as the main northern entrance to Tel Aviv until the Ayalon Highway was completed in the early 1990s.

Limited-access roads in Israel
Roads in Israel